is a former Japanese football player and is the current assistant head coach of J1 League club Cerezo Osaka . His brother is Yutaro Takahashi.

Club statistics

Honors
J.League Cup : 2008

References

External links

Profile at Cerezo Osaka 

1983 births
Living people
Fukuoka University alumni
People from Yame, Fukuoka
Association football people from Fukuoka Prefecture
Japanese footballers
J1 League players
Oita Trinita players
Cerezo Osaka players
Association football midfielders